Lime Kiln Mountain is a long ridge in Taney County in the Ozarks of southern Missouri. Cane Creek, a tributary of Beaver Creek, runs roughly parallel to the ridge along the northeast.

Lime Kiln Mountain was named for a lime kiln which was active in the 19th century.

References

Mountains of Taney County, Missouri
Mountains of Missouri
Lime kilns in the United States